Zurab (Georgian: ზურაბ) is a Georgian masculine given name. It derives from the Persian Sohrab, a name of the legendary warrior from Ferdowsi's Shahnameh. It may refer to:

Zurab Adeishvili (born 1972), Georgian jurist and politician, Minister of Justice of Georgia since 2008
Zurab Arziani (born 1987), Georgian footballer
Zurab Avalishvili (1876–1944), Georgian historian, jurist and diplomat
Zurab Azmaiparashvili (born 1960), chess Grandmaster from Georgia
Zurab Ionanidze (born 1971), footballer for FC Zestafoni, in Georgia's Umaglesi Liga
Zurab Khizanishvili (born 1981), Georgian professional football player who plays for Reading
Zurab Mamaladze (born 1982), Georgian association footballer who plays for Zestaponi
Zurab Menteshashvili (born 1980), football midfielder from Georgia
Zurab Nadarejshvili (born 1957), Georgian composer
Zurab Noghaideli (born 1964), Georgian businessman, politician, Prime Minister of Georgia 2005–2007
Zurab Pochkhua (born 1963), Georgian colonel and Commander of Georgian Air Forces since 2008
Zurab Pololikashvili (born 1977), Georgian politician, diplomat, Secretary-General of the World Tourism Organization
Zurab Rtveliashvili, Georgian poet and multi-media performer
Zurab Sakandelidze (1945–2004), Georgian basketball player
Zurab Sanaya (born 1968), Russian professional football coach and a former player
Zurab Semyonovich Tsereteli (born 1953), retired Georgian professional footballer
Zurab Tchiaberashvili (born 1972), Georgian political rights activist, politician, philosopher and journalist
Zurab Tsereteli (born 1934), controversial Georgian painter, sculptor and architect, President of the Russian Academy of Arts
Zurab Tsiklauri (born 1974), retired Russian professional footballer
Zurab Zhvania (1963–2005), Georgian politician, Prime Minister of Georgia and Speaker of the Parliament of Georgia
Zurab Zviadauri (born 1981), Georgian judoka

References

Georgian masculine given names